David Farrington Thornton (born June 12, 1953) is an American actor. He has appeared in John Q, Home Alone 3 as Earl Unger, Law & Order, The Notebook, and The Other Woman, among other roles. He is the husband of singer songwriter Cyndi Lauper.

Personal life
Thornton was born in Cheraw, South Carolina. He is the son of Robert Donald Thornton (1917-2006), an international authority on the Scottish poet Robert Burns, who taught English at Harvard University among other institutions, and Grace Ellen, née Baker. He graduated from Hamilton College and Yale Drama School and studied at Lee Strasberg's Actors' Studio.

Thornton met singer Cyndi Lauper on the set of the film Off and Running. They married in November 1991 and have a son, Declyn Wallace Thornton (born 1997).

In 2005, the New York Court of Appeals ruled in favor of Thornton in Thornton v. Baron, which is considered a landmark decision in the New York real estate industry, specifically dealing with rent stabilization in New York.

Filmography

References

External links
 

1953 births
Living people
People from Cheraw, South Carolina
American male film actors
American male television actors
Hamilton College (New York) alumni
Male actors from South Carolina
20th-century American male actors
21st-century American male actors